The Myth is a 2005 Hong Kong—Chinese martial arts fantasy-adventure film directed by Stanley Tong, starring Jackie Chan, Tony Leung Ka-fai, Kim Hee-sun, and Mallika Sherawat.

Plot
Based during the Qin dynasty, general Meng Yi (Chan) is tasked with escorting Ok-Soo (referred at times as "Concubine Li") (Kim), a Korean princess, back to China to serve as a concubine for Qin Shi Huang, in an attempt to strengthen diplomatic relationships. Along the journey, a Korean warrior (seemingly her fiancé) attempts to seize her back, but Meng Yi saves her. Meng Yi protects Ok-Soo through their journey back, while Ok-Soo tends to his wounds. In the process, she begins to develop feelings for him but Meng Yi, while apparently harboring similar feelings for her, steps back, reminding her of her purpose of becoming a concubine in the interests of her people and successfully completes his mission. The Qin emperor becomes critically ill later and sends Meng Yi to find the elixir of immortality, the only thing that can save his life. Before leaving, Meng Yi discreetly confesses his feelings to Ok-Soo, stating "my heart belongs to you forever," and Ok-Soo vows to await his return. The guards escorting the elixir are ambushed by rebels on the orders of the treacherous prince and chancellor. Meng Yi hands over the elixir to his deputy, Nangong Yan, before dying in the ensuing battle. Although Nangong Yan manages to bring the elixir to the emperor, the prince and chancellor trick Nangong Yan and Ok-soo to test the validity of the elixir and force them to consume the elixir, condemning them to imprisonment in the Qin emperor's mausoleum for eternity.

In the present day, Jack, an archaeologist (also Chan), is Meng Yi's reincarnation, and he often dreams about his past life. One day, his friend William invites him on a quest to find a rare material that can create a field of zero gravity. They travel to a floating tomb of a Dasar prince in India, where Jack discovers a painting of the princess he has been seeing in his dreams. Jack also learns that during a mission to the Qin Empire, the Dasar prince brought treasures and women as gifts. In return, the Qin emperor offered him one of his concubines and asked him to choose, but refused when the prince chose his favourite, Ok-soo. Instead, the Qin emperor gave him a painting of Ok-soo and the Qin Star Gem. William removes a strange black rock from a feline statue, and accidentally collapses the zero gravity field holding up the tomb, resulting in its destruction. William manages to escape, but Jack leaps off a cliff and falls into a river. He loses consciousness and drifts along with the current until he is saved by Samantha, an Indian peasant girl. Samantha brings Jack to see her uncle, a Kalaripayattu (Indian martial art form) guru, who tells Jack to take the sword he found and fight with one of his students. During the fight, Jack has a recollection of a duel he had with the Dasar prince in his past life, and briefly recovers his fighting skills from his life as Meng Yi. Samantha's uncle enlightens Jack about his past and future, and Jack succeeds in returning home safely, and he delivers the sword to the National Museum of China as a national treasure. His action angered Professor Koo, the leader of the syndicate that has been funding Jack and William's treasure hunt.

After extensive research, Jack and William conclude that the anti-gravity material is a fragment of a meteorite that fell to Earth during the Qin dynasty. They find the location of the Qin emperor's mausoleum, concealed behind a waterfall. The massive tomb contains the strongest fragment of the meteorite, powerful enough to make the tomb a floating palace. Jack meets Ok-soo and Nangong Yan alive inside the tomb, and they mistake him for Meng Yi. Professor Koo and his men enter and attempt to seize the immortality elixir, leading to an aerial fight between both parties. William accidentally breaks the balance of the field after removing a piece of the meteorite and causes the tomb to collapse on itself, and dies from drowning in mercury. While Jack is escaping from the collapsing tomb, he asks Ok-soo to come with him, but she refuses after realizing he is not Meng Yi and says she will wait for the real Meng Yi forever, believing he still lives. As Koo nears the elixir, Yan grabs onto him as they fall and presumably perish.

Jack is then seen at home with a published copy of The Myth, a book written by him about his adventure and his experiences which he dedicates to William.

Cast

 Jackie Chan as:
 General Meng Yi, a General of the Qin dynasty and a member of the court of Qin Shi Huang (the first emperor of China) and Princess Ok-soo's love interest in the past.
 Jack, the film's protagonist. He is a notorious Chinese archeologist who is the reincarnation of Meng Yi. He is also the love interest of both Samantha (an Indian peasant girl) and Princess Ok-soo, a Korean princess who believes that Jack and Meng Yi are the same person.
 Kim Hee-sun as Princess Ok-soo (Hangul: 옥수공주, Hanja: 玉秀公主), a Korean princess from Gojoseon who is offered as a concubine to Qin Shi Huang by her father (who is the current King of Gojoseon), but falls in love with both Meng Yi and his reincarnation, Jack. Although it is not specified who her father would be, it is heavily implied that she would be the daughter of Jun of Gojoseon (since he and Qin Shi Huang ruled their respective empires at the same time).
 Tony Leung Ka-fai as William, a friend of Jack's who is also an archeologist. It is he who invites Jack to a dangerous adventure in India in search of a rare treasure.
 Choi Min-soo as Korean general Choi, a Korean general who is primarily responsible for protecting Princess Ok-soo, who is the daughter of the current King of Gojoseon.
 Mallika Sherawat as Samantha, a Indian peasant girl from the countryside who is the niece of a legendary master of Kalaripayattu (an Indian martial art) and one of Jack's romantic interests (along with Princess Ok-soo).
 Patrick Tam as General Xu Gui
 Shao Bing as Nangong Yan
 Ken Lo as Dragon
 Yu Rongguang as rebel general Zhao Kuang
 Ken Wong as rebel general Meng Jie
 Jin Song as rebel general Jin Song
 Hayama Go as Tiger
 Chan Sek as Cheetah
 He Jun as Phoenix
 Park Hyun Jin as Eagle
 Yao Weixing as Korean general Shen, a Korean general who is primarily responsible for protecting Princess Ok-soo, who is the daughter of the current King of Gojoseon
 Maggie Lau as Maggie
 Yuen Tak as Dasar monk
 Sun Zhou as Professor Koo
 Leon Head as Dr Smith
 Lian Shuliang as Zhao Gao, a politician and eunuch of the Qin dynasty, member of the court of Qin Shi Huang and the man who is highly believed to be responsible for the fall of the Qin dynasty.
 Chen Weiguo as Li Si, a powerful politician who served as chancellor to both Qin Shi Huang and his eighth son/second Emperor of China, Qin Er Shi.
 Zhang Yiqun as Huhai (better known as Qin Er Shi), the eighth son of Qin Shi Huang and the second emperor of China.
 Lee Hok-Tung as the Xi'an museum curator
 Sathyanarayanan G as Dasar prince
 Ram Gopal Bajaj as Dasar martial arts schoolmaster, Samantha's uncle who is the current grandmaster of Kalaripayattu (a legendary but deadly Indian martial art).
 Sudhanshu Pandey as Dasar temple guard captain
 Peter Spurrier as Dr Smith's researcher
 Ng Kong as General Choi's aide
 Jon Foo (extra) (uncredited)

Release

Box office
The Myth was released in Hong Kong on 23 September 2005, and earned a strong HK$6,230,000 in its first three days. It ended its run with HK$17 million, making it the third highest-grossing domestic release in Hong Kong that year, and overseas for a worldwide total of $120 million.

Critical response
On Rotten Tomatoes, the film has an approval rating of 20%, based on reviews from 5 critics, with an average rating of 3.9/10.

Styna Chyn, from filmtreat, wrote: "Even though Jackie Chan did not direct "The Myth," (Stanley Tong), he did produce it; and his creative input echoes throughout this genre-bending action film. Shot in China, Hong Kong, and Hampi, India, "The Myth" is a comedy of epic proportions. Combining historical fantasy, martial arts, and science-fiction, Tong's film follows archaeologist Jack (Jackie Chan) and scientist William (Tony Leung Ka-Fai) on their adventures in investigating the veracity of a myth involving immortality, levitation, and a Korean princess-turned-concubine for Emperor Qin towards the end of the Qin Dynasty."

David Cornelius, from efilmcritic, gave the film 4 out of 5 stars and wrote: "Once again, it’s time to lament that while Jackie Chan has spent the past few years churning out mostly mediocre-or-worse flops like "Around the World in 80 Days" or those damn "Rush Hour" sequels in Hollywood, he's also spent the same time flying back home every now and then to make some darn-good-or-better flicks that, sadly, remain mostly unseen Stateside because they've been unceremoniously dumped onto DVD by the studios that pick up the rights to them but then never really bother to do anything about it."

Jim Hemphill, from Reel Films Reviews, gave the film 4 out of 5 stars and wrote a positive review: "Jackie Chan's The Myth is enjoyable but second-rate Jackie Chan, an action film that's completely satisfying on every level except when compared to the star's own best work. Chan has, in some ways, become a victim of his own excellence: the astonishing stunt work and action choreography of his peak years (the 1980s period of the Police Story and Project A films) have set up expectations that no performer could continue to live up to, certainly not after moving into middle age. Viewers weaned on Chan's classics will undoubtedly find The Myth to be Jackie-lite, a slightly slowed-down version of his usual acrobatics. Yet the film does contain a few superb set pieces reminiscent of vintage Chan, and director Stanley Tong's opulent visual style makes it a feast for the eyes—and the bottom line is that half-speed Jackie Chan is still more dynamic than just about any other action hero."

Robert Koehler of Variety wrote a generally negative review of the film: "Resembling a story session where many ideas are brainstormed and few stick, The Myth messily reps Jackie Chan in epic mode as a [contemporary] archaeologist drawn into a plot to plunder the treasure of the Qin Dynasty's first emperor. As part of a movement in H.K. cinema to return to the ambitious movies of yore, helmer Stanley Tong's multi-period adventure flirts with considerable entertainment on one hand and near self-destruction on the other. Whether Chan's star power will pull in enough international bizbiz is doubtful, though ancillary should flex muscles in most territories."

David Nusair, writing for Reel Film Reviews from the 2005 Toronto International Film Festival, was even less impressed:"That The Myth eventually turns into an almost interminable experience is a shame, given the light-hearted and genuinely entertaining vibe of the film's opening hour...Fortunately, The Myth contains several expectedly impressive action sequences – with a fight set within a rat paper factory an obvious highlight – although it's not long before such moments wear out their welcome. This is particularly true of an unbelievably tedious plot development towards the end, which finds all of the film's central characters forced to duke it out inside some kind of an infinite, gravity-defying mausoleum (!) Chan is reportedly looking to get away from some of the sillier films he's been churning out as of late, but The Myth certainly does not mark a step in the right direction".

Home media
On 4 May 2009, the DVD was released in Cine Asia in the United Kingdom in Region 2. Another version, including "An Introduction to Cine Asia Featurette", was released later in the United Kingdom on 28 February 2011.

Theme song
The theme song for the film, titled Wujin De Ai (無盡的愛; Endless Love) was performed in both Mandarin and Korean by Jackie Chan and Kim Hee-sun. Chan's stanzas were all sung in Mandarin, while Kim's solo stanzas were sung in Korean. However, the duets were all sung in Mandarin.

An alternative version, titled Meili De Shenhua (美麗的神話; Beautiful Myth), was performed in Mandarin by Sun Nan and Han Hong.

The song was reused as the ending theme song for the 2010 television series of the same title. This version was performed in Mandarin by Hu Ge and Bai Bing.

Action team
The Kalaripayattu martial arts were performed by experts from C. V. N. Kalari school, led by Sunil Kumar Gurukkal, and based in the town of Nadakkavu, Calicut in the state of Kerala, India. The list of stunt performers includes: John Foo, Wu Gang, Han Kwan Hua, Lee in Seob, Ken Lo, Park Hyun Jin and William Dewsbury.

Television series

On 10 January 2010, a 50 episodes television series, titled The Myth, was broadcast on CCTV-8 in China. Jackie Chan was the producer for the series while Stanley Tong was the creative director. The television series had a storyline that is different from the film.

See also

 Jackie Chan filmography
 List of Hong Kong films
 List of martial arts films
 Kalaripayattu

References

External links
 Official site
 
 
 Introduction on Jackie Chan's official website
 Behind the scenes and news timeline

2005 films
2005 martial arts films
Martial arts fantasy films
Hong Kong fantasy adventure films
2005 action films
2000s fantasy adventure films
Hong Kong action films
Hong Kong martial arts films
2000s Cantonese-language films
History of Korea on film
Kalarippayattu films
Films set in the Qin dynasty
Films directed by Stanley Tong
Films scored by Nathan Wang
Films shot in Kozhikode
Gojoseon
2000s Hong Kong films